Brian Clarhaut (born April 11, 1986) is an American soccer coach who currently coaches El Paso Locomotive FC in the USL Championship.

Career

Playing career 
Clarhaut played high school soccer for Bishop Eustace Preparatory School from his freshman to junior year, and played for Shawnee High School his senior year, leading the team to the Group IV state championship. In 2002, he set a state season assists record with 27.

Clarhaut played college soccer at Saint Peter's University from 2004 until 2006. He was a member of the All-Metro Atlantic Athletic Conference (MAAC) Academic team.

Coaching career 
On August 13, 2012, Clarhaut was named as an assistant coach to Temple University's men's soccer team. Afterwards, he moved to Sweden where he coached Nyköpings BIS from 2017 to 2019 after being assistant coach for the club from 2016 to 2017.

Clarhaut was named new head coach of Umeå FC on November 28, 2019, signing a two-year contract with an option for an additional year.

In 2021, he became assistant coach to Henrik Åhnstrand at Allsvenskan club GIF Sundsvall. After Åhnstrand was sacked in July 2022, Clarhaut took over as head coach. GIF Sundsvall announced on November 11, Clarhaut will leave his position when the contract ends on December 31.

On December 15, 2022, it was announced that Clarhaut would take over as manager at El Paso Locomotive FC in the USL Championship ahead of the 2023 season.

References 

1986 births
Living people
American expatriate sportspeople in Sweden
American expatriate soccer coaches
American soccer coaches
American soccer players
Association football midfielders
Expatriate football managers in Sweden
Soccer players from New Jersey
Bishop Eustace Preparatory School alumni
Saint Peter's Peacocks soccer players
UConn Huskies men's soccer coaches
Temple Owls men's soccer coaches
GIF Sundsvall managers
People from Medford, New Jersey
Shawnee High School (New Jersey) alumni
Sportspeople from Burlington County, New Jersey
El Paso Locomotive FC coaches
USL Championship coaches